Alwyn John Davies (19 March 1896 – 4 May 1949) was an Australian rules footballer who played for the St Kilda Football Club in the Victorian Football League (VFL).

Notes

External links 

1896 births
1949 deaths
Australian rules footballers from South Australia
St Kilda Football Club players